Její pastorkyně is a 1938 Czechoslovak film directed by Miroslav Cikán. It stars Marie Ptáková, Leopolda Dostalová, and Jiří Dohnal, and is based on a play by Gabriela Preissová.

References

External links
Její pastorkyně at the Internet Movie Database

1938 films
Films directed by Miroslav Cikán
Czech films based on plays
Czechoslovak drama films
1938 drama films
Czechoslovak black-and-white films
1930s Czech films